Laurence Paul Cunningham (8 March 1956 – 15 July 1989) was an English professional footballer. A left winger, he notably played in England, France and Spain, where he became the first ever British player to sign for Real Madrid.

Cunningham had signed a schoolboy contract with Arsenal in 1970, but was released in 1972 as his style of play was deemed incompatible with the Gunners’ “give and go” tactics.

In 1974 he was picked up by second tier side Orient where he remained for 3 years. But it was following his move to West Bromwich Albion in 1977 that his career really took off. There he played alongside Cyrille Regis and Brendon Batson under coach Ron Atkinson, becoming only the second trio of black players to be fielded in the top flight of English football. They became known as 'the Three Degrees' - a term coined by Atkinson in reference to the American soul group of the same name.

His form at the Hawthorns later earned a move to Real Madrid, where he remained for five years, winning La Liga once and the Copa del Rey twice. After a spell in France with Marseille, he returned to England with Leicester City in 1985, followed by a return to Spain with Rayo Vallecano. Cunningham signed with Wimbledon in 1988, where, as a member of the "Crazy Gang", he won the FA Cup in 1988 for the final trophy of his career.

Cunningham received his first international call-up to the England U21 side in 1977 while playing for West Bromwich Albion, becoming the first black footballer to represent an England international team organised by the Football Association. He later earned 6 caps for the full national team between 1979 and 1980, becoming one of the first ever black England internationals.

While playing for Rayo Vallecano, Cunningham was killed in a car crash in Madrid on the morning of 15 July 1989, at the age of 33.

Life and career 

Born in Archway, London, he was the son of a former Jamaican race-horse jockey. Cunningham started in schoolboy football and was turned down by Arsenal before joining Orient in 1974. He joined West Bromwich Albion in 1977, where, under manager Johnny Giles, he teamed up with another black player, Cyrille Regis, and the following year (under Ron Atkinson) with Brendon Batson. This was the second time an English top-flight team simultaneously fielded three black players (the first being Clyde Best, Clive Charles and Ade Coker for West Ham United against Tottenham Hotspur in April 1972) and Atkinson collectively referred to Cunningham, Batson and Regis as "The Three Degrees" after the U.S. soul singing trio.

West Bromwich Albion became one of the most attractive and exciting English sides in the late 1970s and Cunningham soon attracted attention. He became the first black player to wear an England shirt at any level<ref name="The FA">[https://archive.today/20080202124413/http://www.thefa.com/NR/exeres/02E29C89-E076-4290-876C-7D7FAC911081,frameless.htm?NRMODE=Published FA PR— Laurie Cunningham]</ref> in the England under-21s' friendly against Scotland at Bramall Lane on 27 April 1977, scoring on his debut.

Whilst a West Bromwich Albion player he played in a benefit match for Len Cantello, that saw a team of white players play against a team of black players.

He subsequently earned a full England cap, making his debut against Wales in a Home International in 1979. He was to win a total of six caps for England.

In the summer of 1979, he made a historic move as the first British player to transfer to Real Madrid, who paid West Bromwich Albion a fee of £950,000. He scored twice on his debut and helped Real win the league and cup double. Despite this club success, Cunningham was overlooked by England manager Ron Greenwood for a place in the England squad for Euro 1980.

Cunningham began the 1980–81 season with Real Madrid well, and was again called up for England for the 1982 World Cup Qualifier against Norway, only to be an unused sub as England won 4–0. In the next qualifier against Romania, he came off the bench but was unable to help England avoid a 2–1 defeat. This was to be his last England cap. Back with Real Madrid, his scored goals in the early rounds of the European Cup, but then he succumbed to injury, and required an operation on a broken toe.

Cunningham recovered just in time for the 1981 European Cup Final against Liverpool in Paris, as Real Madrid lost 1–0. During pre season training for the 1981–82 season, a thigh injury kept Cunningham out of the majority of the season (only three goalless appearances in the league), his only real noteworthy contribution was in the UEFA Cup quarter final tie against 1. FC Kaiserslautern.

In the first leg, Cunningham scored a goal in Real Madrid's 3–1 win. In the second leg, however, he was sent off shortly before half time for retaliation, as Kaiserslautern won 5–0 to inflict Real Madrid's worst ever result in European competition. Prior to this tie, a finally fit Cunningham had been summoned up for England duty again, but this would be the last time he made an England squad. Cunningham won a second Spanish Cup medal as he played in the final when Real Madrid beat Gijón 2–1, but it was a depressing campaign for him. For the next season, with Real Madrid signing Johnny Metgod to join Uli Stielike as the two permitted foreigners, Cunningham spent most of the 1982–83 season on the sidelines, until he reunited with Ron Atkinson at Manchester United on loan in April 1983. He left Real after the 1982–83 season, joining Sporting Gijón and subsequently Marseille.

Cunningham only remained in France for one season in 1984–85, before heading back to England to join Leicester City, although he played only half a season due to further injury. At the end of the 1985–86 season, Cunningham went back to Spain to play for Rayo Vallecano in the second tier. He moved to Charleroi in Belgium for the 1987–88 campaign, but was yet again struck down by injury, and in the new year was back in England on a short-term deal with Wimbledon, where he managed to help the Dons beat Liverpool in the 1988 FA Cup Final.

Cunningham later moved back to Spain and Rayo Vallecano for the 1988–89 season. He scored the goal that secured their promotion to the Primera Division.

Cunningham was killed in a car crash in Madrid on the morning of 15 July 1989, at the age of 33. He was survived by his Spanish wife and their son.

 Legacy 
In November 2004, he was named as one of West Bromwich Albion's 16 greatest players, in a poll organised as part of the club's 125th anniversary celebrations. The club announced that Cunningham would feature in a mural of the former players to be displayed at The Hawthorns.

In October 2013, the Nubian Jak Community Trust unveiled a blue plaque outside Brisbane Road. In September 2015, English Heritage erected a blue plaque on Cunningham's childhood home at 73 Lancaster Road, Stroud Green, London.

In November 2017, a statue by Graham Ibbeson was unveiled in Coronation Gardens, Leyton, near Brisbane Road, paying tribute to Cunningham and his time at Leyton Orient. Another statue by Ibbeson was unveiled in West Bromwich town centre in May 2019. The work commemorates Cunningham's time at Albion alongside black teammates Brendon Batson and Cyrille Regis, with a spokesperson for the organisers commenting that "the three players opened the gates to allow black players into football at a time when they were locked out".

A play based on his life, Getting the Third Degree by Dougie Blaxland, was first performed in 2019.

Tributes

Career statistics

 Honours 

Real Madrid
 La Liga: 1979–80
 Copa del Rey: 1979–80, 1981–82

Wimbledon
 FA Cup: 1987–88

Bibliography
Bowler, D., & J. Bains (2000), Samba in the Smethwick End: Regis, Cunningham, Batson and the Football Revolution. 
Paul Rees (2014), The Three Degrees The Men Who Changed British Football Forever''.

References

External links
Englandstats.com profile
Profile on football-england.com
Laurie's Legacy, Waltham Forest Council – via YouTube

1956 births
1989 deaths
Footballers from Archway, London
English footballers
English expatriate footballers
England international footballers
England B international footballers
England under-21 international footballers
Association football wingers
Leicester City F.C. players
Leyton Orient F.C. players
Manchester United F.C. players
Real Madrid CF players
Sporting de Gijón players
Olympique de Marseille players
Rayo Vallecano players
Road incident deaths in Spain
West Bromwich Albion F.C. players
Wimbledon F.C. players
Black British sportsmen
English people of Jamaican descent
Belgian Pro League players
Ligue 1 players
La Liga players
Expatriate footballers in Belgium
Expatriate footballers in France
Expatriate footballers in Spain
English expatriate sportspeople in Spain
English expatriate sportspeople in France
English expatriate sportspeople in Belgium
FA Cup Final players
Black British sportspeople